Bowlees and Friar House Meadows is a Site of Special Scientific Interest in the Teesdale district of west County Durham, England. It consists of three traditionally-managed hay meadows in the valley of the River Tees immediately upstream of Low Force waterfall.

The site is important as preserving a rich assemblage of plant species, including some that are locally rare, in a habitat that is widely threatened by intensive agricultural practices.

References

Sites of Special Scientific Interest in County Durham
Meadows in County Durham